Christiane Noll (born October 5, 1968) is an American actress and singer known for her work in musicals and on the concert stage. She originated the role of Emma Carew in Frank Wildhorn's Jekyll & Hyde, and had roles in Urinetown, Ragtime, and Dear Evan Hansen.

Life and career
Noll was born in New York City and raised in Leonia, New Jersey, where she attended Leonia High School. She is the daughter of conductor and Emmy Award-winning Music Supervisor for CBS, the late Ron Noll, and soprano Sara-Ann Noll.  She graduated from Carnegie Mellon University. In 2006, Noll married actor Jamie LaVerdiere, who appeared in the Broadway production of the musical The Pirate Queen in 2007. The couple's first child, a girl, was born in February 2009. Noll has established the Charlotte Black Memorial Fund as an endowed award at Carnegie Mellon University.

Stage work
Noll created the role of Emma in the Broadway production of Jekyll & Hyde in 1997 after playing the role in out-of-town tryouts. She also appeared on Broadway in the revue, It Ain't Nothin' but the Blues (1999). Noll earned good notices for her performances as Kathie in The Student Prince in 2000 at the Paper Mill Playhouse and Marianne in City Center Encores! The New Moon (2003). Noll received an Ovation Award for her role as Hope Cladwell in the National Tour of Urinetown (2004). She also created the roles of Vanna Vane in The Mambo Kings musical (2005), Jane Smart in the American premier of The Witches of Eastwick at the Signature Theatre in Arlington, Virginia (2007), Elizabeth Lavenza in the rock musical Frankenstein - A New Musical (2007 off-Broadway, 37 Arts) and Jordan in The Piper at the NY Music Theatre Festival (2007). Noll appeared as Ruth in 2008 in Ace at the Signature Theatre in Arlington. In 2010 Noll was seen on Broadway as Mother in the revival of Ragtime at the Neil Simon Theatre for which she was nominated for a Tony Award for Best Performance by a Leading Actress in a Musical.

Noll has starred in the national tours of Grease, as Sandy, Miss Saigon, as Ellen, and City of Angels, as Mallory/Avril, as well as a tour of Australia and Thailand as Nellie in South Pacific. She performed with Plácido Domingo in the Washington National Opera's The Merry Widow as Valencienne at The Kennedy Center (2005). Other stage credits include Mabel in Mack & Mabel (for which she won a 2004 Connecticut Critics Circle Award), Genvieve in The Baker's Wife (2002), Lizzie in Lizzie Borden (2001 at Goodspeed Opera House), The Baker's Wife in Into the Woods (2005), Carrie in Carousel, Laura in A Fine & Private Place, (2006 off-Broadway York Theater), Woman 2 in Little by Little, (1999 off-Broadway York Theater), and Mabel in Eugene Opera's The Pirates of Penzance (2006).  Regional theatre productions include Oliver!, All Night Strut, Cinderella, Annie, 42nd Street, My Fair Lady, Sweeney Todd, and Little Shop of Horrors (American Music Theatre of San Jose (2008)). She played Mother in Ragtime at the Kennedy Center (2009) winning a 2010 Helen Hayes Award for Best Actress in a Musical.

Noll was part of the first national touring company for Dear Evan Hansen, playing the role of Cynthia Murphy. She later took over the same role in the Broadway company in October of 2019, and resumed (along with the rest of the company) in December 2021 after the COVID-19 Broadway hiatus. Her run in the show ended on July 17 2022, but she returned to cover the role in the beginning of September 2022 when Ann Sanders fell ill.

Noll is heard on concept albums for a new musical, The New Picasso, which was released in January 2008, and Dracula, released in 2006.

Concert, cabaret and recording work

Noll frequently performs Broadway favorites in concert and has been a guest soloist as part of Bravo Broadway with the National Symphony and Marvin Hamlisch, The Cincinnati Pops, The Columbus Symphony Orchestra, The Jerusalem Symphony, The Philadelphia Pops and Peter Nero, and has sung with The Cleveland Orchestra, the Detroit Symphony, the Alabama Symphony Orchestra, The Harrisburg Symphony, The San Francisco Symphony, and the Sinfonica Brasileira in Rio de Janeiro, Brazil.  She made her Carnegie Hall debut with Skitch Henderson, in his last New York Pops performance, as part of 3 Broadway Divas.

Noll also performs a solo cabaret show and has been a featured member of the Broadway Inspirational Voices Gospel Choir.

Noll appeared as Sister Margaretta in the 2013 NBC broadcast of The Sound of Music Live!.

Noll has released four solo CD’s, Christiane Noll - A Broadway Love Story (1998), The Ira Gershwin Album (2001), Live at the Westbank Café (2003) and Christiane Noll - My Personal Property (2008). She supplied the singing-voice of Anna in the Warner Bros. animated feature The King and I (1999). Some of her numerous recordings are Jekyll & Hyde (1997), The King & I (1999, Sony Classics), Little by Little (1999), A Christmas Survival Guide (2000), What's a Nice Girl Like You..., Z: The Masked Musical (2000), Bravo Broadway 2, The Three Broadway Divas (with two fellow Divas - Jan Horvath and Debbie Gravitte), Far from the Madding Crowd (2000), The New Moon (2003), Neo: A Celebration of Emerging Talent in Musical Theatre, Benefiting the York Theatre Company (2005), and albums of the music of Stephen Sondheim, Burt Bacharach, Paul Simon, Scott Alan and Stephen Schwartz, among others.

Discography
 Jekyll & Hyde (1997)
 Christiane Noll - A Broadway Love Story (1998)
 The King and I (1999)
 Little by Little (1999)
 A Christmas Survival Guide (2000)
 Far from the Madding Crowd (2000)
 Z: The Masked Musical (2000) The Ira Gershwin Album (2001)
 Live at the Westbank Café (2003)
 The New Moon (2003)
  Neo: A Celebration of Emerging Talent in Musical Theatre, Benefiting the York Theatre Company (2005)
 Christiane Noll - My Personal Property (2008)
 Frankenstein - A New Musical (2008)
 What I Wanna Be When I Grow Up by Scott Alan (2010) -- sings the song I Remember Scott Alan - Live (2012) -- sings the song Again''

References

External links
 
Noll's official website
2006 NY Times review of Noll's performance
Detailed review of a Noll album
Listing of available Noll albums
Bravo Broadway's website

American musical theatre actresses
American sopranos
Leonia High School alumni
People from Leonia, New Jersey
Actresses from New York City
Living people
1968 births
21st-century American women